Anthony Tyler Quinn is an American actor best known for playing Jonathan Turner on Boy Meets World from 1994 to 1997, a role he later reprised on Girl Meets World.

Career 

He has appeared in numerous TV shows and movies (especially TV movies) in addition to playing Jonathan Turner in Boy Meets World and Girl Meets World, including a recurring role as Randy Thorsen in several episodes of Season 4 of Caroline in the City. In 2011, he played Ron in one episode of Pretty Little Liars. He also played Dexter's dentist in one episode of Dexter in 2008. In 2017, he portrayed Wendell Corey in Feud: Bette and Joan. Other roles include Sam "The Butcher" Marchetti in 3rd Rock from the Sun and Rory Blake and Lt. Tim Truman in Melrose Place.

Personal life
Quinn married his high school sweetheart Margaret on June 15, 1985. They have two children, a daughter named Andie Tyler and a son named Roman Gabriel. Quinn is a Christian.

Partial filmography

Angel (1982) - Maloney
Airwolf (1984, TV Series) - Everett
Peyton Place (1985, TV Movie) - Joey Harrington
Problem Child (1990) - (voice)
Working Girl (1990, TV Series) - Sal Pascarella
The Chase (1991, TV Movie) - Dale
Someone Like Me (1994, TV Series) - Steven Stepjak
Boy Meets World (1994–1997, TV Series) - Jonathan Turner
Melrose Place (1994-1998, TV Series) - Rory Blake / Lt. Tim Truman
Abandoned and Deceived (1995, TV Movie)
Killer: A Journal of Murder (1995) - (voice)
JAG (1998, TV Series) - Sergente Giovanni Cade
Ask Harriet (1998, TV Series) - Jack Cody / Sylvia Coco
3rd Rock From the Sun (1999, TV Series) - Sam "the butcher" Marchetti
Caroline in the City (1999, TV Series) - Randy / Randy Thorsen
Just Shoot Me! (2000, TV Series) - Brad
Diagnosis Murder (2001, TV Series) - Calvin Laird
Smuggler's Ransom (2006) - Bill Donley
Ghost Whisperer (2008, TV Series) - Mr. Linarcos
The Mentalist (2009, TV Series) - Lawyer
No Greater Love (2010) - Jeff Baker
House M.D. (2010, TV Series) - Eli Morgan 
A Christmas Snow (2010) - Andrew
The New Republic (2011) - Hendrix
Pretty Little Liars (2012, TV Series) - Ron
Days of Our Lives (2013, TV Series) - Joe Bernardi
NCIS (2014, TV Series) - Navy Commander Clarence Daniels
Greyscale (2015) - Jonathon Cole
Zer0-Tolerance (2017) - Anthony Boyd
Girl Meets World (2015-2017, TV Series) - Jonathan Turner
Feud: Bette and Joan (2017, TV Series) - Wendell Corey

References

External links

Year of birth missing (living people)
Living people
Male actors from Connecticut
American male film actors
American male television actors
People from New London, Connecticut
20th-century American male actors
21st-century American male actors